The 2019–20 season was Manchester City Women's Football Club's 32nd season of competitive football and its seventh season in the FA Women's Super League and at the top level of English women's football.

On 13 March 2020, in line with the FA's response to the coronavirus pandemic, it was announced the season was temporarily suspended until at least 3 April 2020. After further postponements, the season was ultimately ended prematurely on 25 May 2020 with immediate effect. Manchester City sat in 1st place at the time, one point ahead of Chelsea having played a game more, but dropped down to 2nd place on sporting merit after The FA Board's decision to award places on a points-per-game basis and award Chelsea the title.

Non-competitive

Pre-season
2019 Women's International Champions Cup

Competitions

Women's Super League

League table

Results summary

Results by matchday

Matches

FA Cup

League Cup

Group stage

Knockout phase

Champions League

Round of 32

Round of 16

Squad information

Playing statistics

Appearances (Apps.) numbers are for appearances in competitive games only including sub appearances
Red card numbers denote:   Numbers in parentheses represent red cards overturned for wrongful dismissal.

Transfers and loans

Transfers in

Transfers out

Loans out

References

Manchester City
2019